T.J. Racer (born Anthony Brehmer) is a bassist born in Milwaukee, Wisconsin.

Racer was the original bass player for glam metal band Nitro, and appeared their first album, O.F.R.. Racer appeared in their first two videos for the songs Freight Train and Long Way From Home. He played bass on Nitro singer Jim Gillette's solo album Proud To Be Loud, along with Nitro guitarist Michael Angelo Batio. It was long-rumored that T.J. Racer appeared on the unreleased third Vinnie Vincent album Guitars From Hell with drummer Andrè LaBelle, but this was dispelled in an interview with Jason Saulnier. Racer and LaBelle appeared together on the 2008 album KISS MY ANKH: A Tribute To Vinnie Vincent, contributing a cover of "Boyz Are Gonna Rock" along with guitarist/vocalist Mike Weeks.

He is currently a bass guitar instructor.

Discography

Jim Gillette
Proud To Be Loud (1987)

Nitro
O.F.R. (1989)
Gunnin' For Glory (1998)

Vinnie Vincent
Kiss My Ankh: A Tribute To Vinnie Vincent (2008)

References

External links
TJ Racer's Homepage"

Nitro (band) members
American rock bass guitarists
American male bass guitarists
Living people
1968 births
20th-century American bass guitarists
20th-century American male musicians
Musicians from Milwaukee